A bris is a Jewish male circumcision ceremony.

Bris may also refer to:

"The Bris", a 1993 Seinfeld episode
Bris Roar, short name for the Brisbane Roar FC football team